Deh Golan (also Romanized as Deh Golān; also known as Deh Bozān) is a village in Seyyed Jamal ol Din Rural District, in the Central District of Asadabad County, Hamadan Province, Iran. At the 2006 census, its population was 234, in 61 families.

References 

Populated places in Asadabad County